Richard Raymond Cadette (born 21 March 1965) is an English former professional footballer who played as a forward, most notably for Falkirk, Brentford and Southend United. After his retirement he moved into management with Tooting & Mitcham United.

Playing career

Early years
Born in Hammersmith, Cadette began his career in non-League football with Isthmian League First Division club Wembley, before securing a move to the Football League with Third Division club Orient in August 1984. He made 28 appearances and scored five goals in a disastrous 1984–85 season for the Os, which saw the club relegated to the Fourth Division. He departed Brisbane Road after the season.

Southend United 
Cadette signed for Fourth Division club Southend United in a £4,000 deal in August 1985. He had an emphatic start to his career at Roots Hall, scoring four goals in a 5–1 rout of former club Orient on his full league debut for the club. He scored 56 goals in 104 appearances over the course of two seasons and celebrated promotion to the Third Division with a third-place finish at the end of the 1986–87 season. Cadette twice named in the PFA Fourth Division Team of the Year while with the Shrimpers and was also voted the club's 1985–86 Player of the Year. He left the club after the season.

Sheffield United 
Cadette moved up to Second Division to sign for Sheffield United in July 1987, in a move which was settled by tribunal for £90,000. He failed to replicate his previous goalscoring form, netting just seven times in 33 appearances, before departing at the end of the 1987–88 season.

Brentford 
Cadette moved back to London to sign for Third Division club Brentford in July 1988 for an £80,000 fee. Brought in by manager Steve Perryman to form a strike partnership with Gary Blissett, Cadette hit the ground running, top scoring with 17 goals in the 1988–89 season, before having his season cut short by injury in March 1989. He featured in Brentford's run to the quarter-finals of the FA Cup, which ended in a 4–0 defeat to giants Liverpool, with Cadette hitting the post with a chance which could have put the Bees 1–0 up.

The arrival of Dean Holdsworth up front for the 1989–90 season and the change to route one tactics pushed Cadette out of contention. Out of favour at, Cadette joined Second Division strugglers Bournemouth on loan until the end of the 1989–90 season in March 1990. He scored one goal in 8 appearances. Cadette rejected a move to a Dutch Eerste Divisie club during the 1990 off-season and stayed at Griffin Park on a weekly contract. He scored seven goals from 39 appearances in the 1990–91 season, which was ended after he underwent knee surgery in April 1991.

Cadette was offered a new contract in the 1991 off-season, but again turned it down to remain on a weekly arrangement. He began the 1991–92 season up front alongside Holdsworth, but fell behind Blissett in the pecking order in October 1991 and departed Griffin Park in January 1992. Cadette made 123 appearances and scored 31 goals in three-and-a-half years with Brentford. Looking back in 2005, Cadette revealed that despite his differences with manager Phil Holder (who had been promoted from Steve Perryman's assistant in 1990), he appreciated the support he received from the fans.

Falkirk 
Cadette joined Scottish League Premier Division club Falkirk for a £50,000 fee in January 1992, linking up with former Brentford teammates Tony Parks and Eddie May. He had a successful two-and-a-half years with the club, winning the 1993–94 Scottish Challenge Cup (scoring in the final after being famously attacked by manager Jim Jefferies at half time) and the First Division title, which secured an immediate return to the top-flight. He departed Brockville Park in October 1994, after a spell which Jim Jefferies described as "phenomenal".

Millwall 
Cadette returned to England to sign for First Division club Millwall on loan in October 1994. He signed a permanent £130,000 deal the following month. In what turned out to be a disastrous move, Cadette made just 27 appearances and scored 6 goals in almost three years at The New Den.

Shelbourne 
After a trial with Clydebank, Cadette signed for League of Ireland club Shelbourne on a short-term contract in August 1997, as cover for the injured Stephen Geoghegan and Pat Morley.

Clydebank 
Cadette rejoined Scottish League Second Division club Clydebank in late August 1997, scoring one goal in seven appearances before departing the following month.

Gloucester City 
Cadette dropped into non-League football to join Southern League Premier Division club Gloucester City during the 1997–98 season, making just three appearances.

Coaching career
After retiring as a player, Cadette became involved with the youth setup at former club Millwall. He later managed Isthmian League First Division club Tooting & Mitcham between November 2002 and May 2006. He was sacked at the end of the 2005–06 season, after defeat to Tonbridge Angels in the playoff semi-finals.

Career statistics

Honours 
Southend United
 Football League Fourth Division third-place promotion: 1986–87

Brentford
 Football League Third Division: 1991–92

Falkirk
 Scottish League First Division: 1993–94
 Scottish Challenge Cup: 1993–94

Individual
 Southend United Player of the Year: 1985–86
 PFA Fourth Division Team of the Year: 1985–86, 1986–87

References

External links 

1965 births
AFC Bournemouth players
Brentford F.C. players
Clydebank F.C. (1965) players
English football managers
English footballers
Falkirk F.C. players
Gloucester City A.F.C. players
League of Ireland players
Leyton Orient F.C. players
Living people
Millwall F.C. players
Scottish Football League players
Sheffield United F.C. players
Shelbourne F.C. players
Southend United F.C. players
English Football League players
Association football forwards
Wembley F.C. players
Footballers from Hammersmith
Black British sportspeople
Tooting & Mitcham United F.C. managers
Isthmian League players
Isthmian League managers
Southern Football League players